"The Sixth Year" is an episode of the TV anthology series The Philco Television Playhouse. It was written by Paddy Chayefsky, directed by Arthur Penn and stars Kim Stanley.

Plot
A wife becomes exasperated with her husband who seems to have lost the will to work. She takes their child and leaves. He finds a menial job and asks her to come home. She seeks advice on the situation from her mother and father.

Reception
The TV critic from the Christian Science Monitor wrote that "Mr Chayefsky's humanity operates to assist an understanding of even the unsympathetic mother. Kim Stanley portrayed the young wife with the subtle responsiveness and controlled emotional power that assist intimacy in television acting."

References

External links
 

1953 American television episodes
Works by Paddy Chayefsky
The Philco Television Playhouse episodes